The TeST TST-7 Junior is a Czech shoulder-wing, single-seat motor glider that was designed and produced by TeST of Brno. When it was available the aircraft was supplied as plans, in kit form for amateur construction or as a complete ready-to-fly aircraft. Production is now complete and the aircraft is no longer available new.

Design and development
The TST-7 Junior was a development of the TST-1 Alpine self-launching sailplane, with a design goal of producing an aircraft more suited for use as a touring motor glider with docile handling.

The TST-7 is built from wood, with some fibreglass parts. The  span, shoulder-mounted, slightly forward-swept wing employs a Wortmann FX 61-184 airfoil and has top-surface air brakes. The landing gear is of tricycle configuration, making ground handling the aircraft much easier than the monowheel gear used on the TST-1.

The aircraft was supplied as a standard kit rated at 400 hours for completion and that did not include the powerplant. An Express-Build kit was also available that could be completed in 250 hours. The factory also built some TST-7s as ready-to-fly models that were US$16,250 in 1998 with the M 125 engine and US$17,540 in 2000 with the Rotax powerplant. The plans cost US$350 in 2000.

Specifications (TST-7 Junior)

See also

References

External links
Photo of TeST TST-7 Junior

TST-7
1990s Czech and Czechoslovakian sailplanes
Homebuilt aircraft
Shoulder-wing aircraft